Galindians were two distinct, and now extinct, tribes of the Balts.  Most commonly, Galindians refers to the Western Galindians who lived in the southeast part of Prussia.  Less commonly, it is used for a tribe that lived in the area of what is today Moscow.

The name "Galinda" is thought to derive from the Baltic word *galas ("the end"), alluding to the fact that they settled for some time further west and further east than any other Baltic tribe.

Western Galindians  
The Western Galindians (Old Prussian: *Galindis, Latin: Galindae) – at first a West Baltic tribe, and later an Old Prussian clan – lived in Galindia, roughly the area of present-day Masuria but including territory further south in what would become the Duchy of Masovia. The region lay adjacent to the territory of the Yotvingians, which is today in Podlaskie Voivodeship.The name Galind- is probably derived from the hydronym of Gielądzkie Jezioro (53° 52' N, 21° 10' E) in the province of Olsztyn, in what was the very center of ancient Galindia. J. Nalepa (1971) suggested the root *gal- was originally a different ablaut grade of the same root found in Lith. "gilus" – deep, and "gelmė" – depth. The original meaning referred to the depth of the lake mentioned, which is one of the deepest in the area.

Ptolemy was the first to mention the Galindians (Koine Greek: Galindoi – Γαλίνδοι) in the 2nd century AD. From the 6th/7th century until the 17th century the former central part of the Galindian tribe continued to exist as the Old Prussian clan of *Galindis. The language of the Old Prussians in Galindia became extinct by 17th century, mainly because of the 16th centuries influx of Protestants seeking refuge from Catholic Poland into the Galindian area and German-language administration of Prussia.

Eastern Galindians 

The Eastern Galindians (East Galindian: *Galindai, from Old East Slavic *Golędĭ), an extinct East Baltic tribe, lived from the 4th century in the basin of the Protva River, near the modern Russian towns of Mozhaysk, Vereya, and Borovsk. It is probable that the Eastern Galindians, as the bearers of the Moshchiny culture, also occupied all the Kaluga Oblast before the Early East Slavs populated the Moshchiny culture's area at the turn of the 7th and 8th centuries.

The Golyad are first mentioned in the Laurentian Codex, where it is written that they were conquered by Iziaslav I of Kiev in 1058. This shows that even at the height of the power of the Kievan Rus', were not its subjects or tributaries. The Hypatian Codex mentions that Sviatoslav Olgovich defeated the Golyad' who lived near the Porotva (now Protva) river in 1147. The annals mentioned that Mikhail Khorobrit killed by "Lithuania on the Porotva" in 1248, which clearly refers to the Galindians.

The Prince Yuri Dolgorukiy arranged a campaign against them in 1147, the year of the first mention of Moscow in the Russian chronicles. Subsequent chronicles do not mention the Eastern Galindians. 

Nevertheless, the Russians probably did not completely assimilate them until the 15th (or 16th) century. Some people still identified as Goliads in the 19th century. Their folk traditions lived on into the 20th century.

See also 
 Gelonians and Balts
 Dniepr Balts
 Yotvingians
 Neuri

Notes

References

Sources 

 
 
 
 
 

People from Prussia proper
Old Prussians
Historical Baltic peoples
History of Warmian-Masurian Voivodeship